Mangel or Mangels may refer to:

People
Mangel (surname)
Mangel, a common nickname for the Spanish given name Miguel Ángel
Mangels (surname)
Mangel (footballer), full name Miguel Ángel Prendes Pérez, Spanish footballer

Places
 Mangel, Nigeria, a Tiv village in Benue State

Fictional places 
 Mangel, an English town in Charlie Williams's Mangel Trilogy

Other uses
Mangels-Illions Carousel, a carousel at the Columbus Zoo and Aquarium
Mangel Trilogy, three books set in the fictional town of Mangel, by Charlie Williams
Mangelwurzel, Mangel wurzel, a root vegetable, used as animal fodder, member of the Beta vulgaris family
Mangel, a defunct clothing store and former owner of Shoppers Fair stores

See also
 Mangle (disambiguation)
 Mangal (disambiguation)